Carbad More is a double court cairn and National Monument located in County Mayo, Ireland.

Location

History

The double court cairn was possibly constructed .

Description
Carbad More is a double court cairn, with the main axis running NE-SW. Both galleries are covered in thick vegetation. At either end of the remains of a cairn are the remnants of two almost circular courts, each leading into its own segmented gallery.

References

National Monuments in County Mayo
Archaeological sites in County Mayo